Holley can refer to:

People
 Holley (surname)
a masculine given name (derived from the surname)
Holley Mims (1929–1970), American boxer
a feminine given name, spelling variant of Holly, see Holly (name)

Places

United States
 Holley, Florida
 Holley, Georgia
 Holley, New York
 Holley, Oregon

Companies 
 Holley Performance Products, an American manufacturer of carburetors and fuel systems for performance cars (e.g. NASCAR)

See also
 Holly (disambiguation)